The 2009–10 season was Queen of the South's eighth consecutive season in the Scottish First Division, having been promoted from the Scottish Second Division at the end of the 2001–02 season. Queens also competed in the Challenge Cup, League Cup and the Scottish Cup.

Summary
Queen of the South finished fourth in the First Division. They reached the third round of the Challenge Cup, the third round of the League Cup and the third round of the Scottish Cup.

Management
The club was managed during season 2009–10 by Gordon Chisholm. On 22 March 2010, Chisholm left the club to become the new manager of Dundee, taking coach Billy Dodds with him to become his assistant manager. Chisholm's assistant Kenny Brannigan was appointed as manager until the end of the season although his contract was extended in April, until May 2011.

Results and fixtures

Scottish First Division

Scottish Challenge Cup

Scottish League Cup

Scottish Cup

Player statistics

Squad 

|}

League table

See also
List of Queen of the South F.C. seasons

References

2009–10
Queen of the South